Dibra is an Albanian surname. Notable people with the surname include:
 Abdurrahman Dibra (1885–1961), Albanian politician
 Arenc Dibra (born 1990), Albanian footballer
 Dino Dibra (1975–2000), Australian suspected murderer
 Fuad Dibra (1886–1944), Albanian politician and nationalist
 Gëzim Dibra (born 1956), Albanian politician
 Ilir Dibra (born 1977), Albanian retired footballer
 Isuf Dibra (? – 1927), Albanian politician
 Izet Dibra (1878–1964), Albanian politician
 Klejdi Dibra (born 1992), Albanian footballer
 Muhamet Dibra (1923–1998), Albanian footballer
 Petrit Dibra (born 1953), Albanian former footballer
 Ridvan Dibra (born 1959), Albanian writer
 Vehbi Dibra (1867–1937),  Albanian mufti, theologian and publicist

Albanian-language surnames